Ice Age is a progressive band from New York City, USA. 

Founded by guitarist Jimmy Pappas, vocalist/keyboardist Josh Pincus, drummer Hal Aponte and bassist Arron DiCesare, the band released their debut album in 1999, titled The Great Divide. Liberation followed in 2001, both on Magna Carta Records.

Ice Age were influenced by pop/progressive bands such as Yes, Kansas and Rush, but also by more modern progressive metal bands like Queensrÿche, and Dream Theater.

In 2004, the band officially changed their name to Soulfractured.  This was accompanied by an announced shift in the band's music - less overt progressive experimentation, with closer attention paid to melodic structure and songcraft.  In this incarnation the band released the Soulfractured EP, made available through the band's websites. They had previously released the Little Bird EP (2004) as Ice Age.  Shortly after the second EP's release, the group disbanded in 2006.

The band reformed in 2015 under their original moniker. In May 2022, the band announced they has signed to Sensory Records and would be releasing their first album in 22 years in the fall. On January 4, 2023, the band announced the album, Waves of Loss and Power, would be released on March 10.

Discography
Studio albums
 The Great Divide (1999)
 Liberation (2001)
 Waves of Loss and Power (2023)

EPs
 Little Bird (2004)
 Soulfractured (2006) (Released under band name Soulfractured)

See also
 Tool (band)
 Tesseract (band)
 Kansas (band)
 Dream Theater (band)
 Fates Warning (band)
 Rush (band)

References

External links
Ice Age Official Instagram
Ice Age Official Twitter
Ice Age's official site
Soulfractured's official site
Magna Carta - Artists - Ice Age

American progressive metal musical groups